Young Cardinaud (French: Le Fils Cardinaud) is a 1942 novel by the French-based Belgian writer Georges Simenon.

Adaptation
In 1956 it was adapted into the film Blood to the Head directed by Gilles Grangier and starring Jean Gabin and Claude Sylvain.

References

Bibliography
 Carter, David. The Pocket Essential Georges Simenon. Pocket Essentials, 2003.
 Goble, Alan. The Complete Index to Literary Sources in Film. Walter de Gruyter, 1999.

1942 Belgian novels
1942 French novels
Novels by Georges Simenon
Belgian novels adapted into films
Novels set in France